The AWS Shopper (A.W.S = Automobilwerk  Walter Schätzle) was a German Automobile manufactured in Berlin (Germany) from 1973 to 1974. The first car was shown in 1970 and a few hand-built cars were made, but series production began in 1973. 1700 were made.

History 
The AWS Shopper was designed by Walter Schätzle in 1970, an erstwhile Borgward dealer. The factory was located in West Berlin, in Rudow. The company first started to manufacture the car in 1973. While the brand's marketing was strong, the demand for this car was low during the 1970s. The company ceased manufacture in 1974.

Design 
The AWS Shopper's internal design was unique, the frame was made with square steel tubes connected by special angular brackets, and the shell of the car was made from plasticized sheet metal panels. This meant that fixing the car was simple. Goggomobil parts were also used.

Mechanical information:
Model name: Shopper or Piccolo
Years produced: 1971-1974
Number of models produced: 1400 Shopper, 300 Piccolo
Length: 
Width: 
Weight 
Number of seats: 4
Motor: Glas 2-stroke
Cylinders: 2
Displacement: 293 cc
Horsepower: 15
Gear box: 4 + rev
Electrics: 12v
Ignition: 2 x coil
Chassis: platform
Suspension (front & back): coil
Steering: rack
Brakes: hydraulic
4 Wheels: 480 x 10
Top speed:

See also 
Goggomobil

External links 
1973 AWS Shopper - 
AWS History (in German) - 

Microcars
Defunct motor vehicle manufacturers of Germany
Cars introduced in 1973